Tennessee wine refers to wine made from grapes grown in the U.S. state of Tennessee.  The state was home to a wine industry in the 19th century that was greatly impacted when Prohibition was introduced in the early 20th century.  The modern Tennessee wine industry focuses on French hybrid and native grapes, which are more resistant to the fungal grapevine diseases that thrive in Tennessee's humid climate.  Most of the wineries in the state are located in Middle and East Tennessee.  A small portion of the Mississippi Delta AVA, a designated American Viticultural Area extends into the southwestern part of the state.

References

 
Wine regions of the United States by state